Hafdar Rural District is a rural district (dehestan) in the Central District of Sorkheh County, Semnan Province, Iran. At the 2006 census, its population was 2,997, in 816 families.  The rural district has 6 villages.

References 

Rural Districts of Semnan Province
Sorkheh County